Nehale lya Mpingana (died 28 April 1908) was Omukwaniilwa of Ondonga, a subtribe of the Owambo, in German South West Africa. Their tribal area is situated around Namutoni on the eastern edge of Etosha pan in today's northern Namibia. He reigned over the eastern part of the Ondonga area from 1884 until his death; Kambonde II kaMpingana was chief of the western part.

Under Mpingana's leadership the Ondonga fought and won two wars against intruders into their area. In 1886, South African settlers on their Dorsland Trek were defeated after they—allegedly fraudulently—acquired land between Otavi and Grootfontein, and declared it to be the Republic of Upingtonia. Mpingana's men shot William Worthington Jordan, the leader of the trek. The group dispersed after the attack, with some settlers moving on towards Angola, and others turning back to the Transvaal.

On 28 January 1904, 500 men under Mpingana attacked Imperial Germany Schutztruppe at Fort Namutoni in the Battle of Namutoni. The 7 defenders of the fort fled under the cover of the night. Mpingana and his men confiscated horses and cattle and destroyed the outpost. After his death in 1908 he was succeeded by Kambonde III kaNgula.

Recognitions
 Nehale Mpingana is one of nine national heroes of Namibia that were identified at the inauguration of the country's Heroes' Acre near Windhoek. Founding president Sam Nujoma remarked in his inauguration speech on 26 August 2002 that:
Chief Nehale Lya Mpingana [fought] many battles against Afrikaner trekkers and German colonial forces in our people's resistance against colonialism and foreign invaders. [...] To his revolutionary spirit and his visionary memory we humbly offer our honor and respect.

 Nehale is honoured in form of a granite tombstone with his name engraved and his portrait plastered onto the slab.
Chief Mpingana has numerous namesakes in Namibia, for instance Nehale Senior Secondary School in Oshikoto Region.
 Chief Nehale Mpingana Gate to Etosha. Nehale lyaMpingana Constituency, an electoral constituency in the Oshikoto Region, was created and named in his honour in August 2013.

References

1908 deaths
Namibian politicians
Ovambo people
Year of birth uncertain
National heroes of Namibia
Namibian revolutionaries